Salduz Kola-ye Bala (also Romanized as Sāldūz Kolā-ye Bālā) is a village in Talarpey Rural District, in the Central District of Simorgh County, Mazandaran Province, Iran. At the 2006 census, its population was 240, in 59 families.

References 

Populated places in Simorgh County